The 1876 Northwestern University football team represented Northwestern University during the 1876 college football season. The first Northwestern football team played one game, losing to the Chicago Football Club with two goals from touchdown and three touchdowns scored.

Schedule

References

Northwestern University
Northwestern Wildcats football seasons
Northwestern University football